Delicious Surprise is the fourth studio album by American country music artist Jo Dee Messina, released in 2005. Her first studio album since Burn almost five years previous, it produced a Number One single on the Billboard country music charts in "My Give a Damn's Busted", a song co-written by country singer Joe Diffie and originally recorded on his 2001 album In Another World. Additional singles released from Delicious Surprise include "Delicious Surprise (I Believe It)", "Not Going Down", and "It's Too Late to Worry", all of which charted in the Top 40 on the country charts as well. The album has been certified Gold by the RIAA.

Track listing

Personnel
Compiled from liner notes.

Musicians

Larry Beaird – acoustic guitar
Mark Beckett – drums
Bekka Bramlett – tambo drums, tambourine, background vocals
Mike Brignardello – bass guitar
Pat Buchanan – electric guitar
Tom Bukovac – electric guitar
Lisa Cochran – background vocals
Dan Dugmore – steel guitar
Stuart Duncan – fiddle, mandolin
Shannon Forrest – drums, percussion
Larry Franklin – mandolin
Paul Franklin – steel guitar, slide guitar, Dobro
Kevin "Swine" Grantt – bass guitar
Kenny Greenberg – electric guitar
Aubrey Haynie – fiddle, mandolin
Wes Hightower – background vocals
Troy Lancaster – electric guitar
Michael Landau – electric guitar
B. James Lowry – acoustic guitar
Brent Mason – electric guitar, acoustic guitar
Jo Dee Messina – lead vocals
Gene Miller – tambo drums, background vocals 
Steve Nathan – piano, synthesizer, synthesizer strings, organ, Wurlitzer electric piano
Jimmy Nichols – keyboards, organ, accordion, piano
Russ Pahl – steel guitar, banjo, electric guitar, Dobro
Kim Parent – background vocals
Javier Solis – tambo drums
Bryan Sutton – acoustic guitar
Russell Terrell – background vocals
Lonnie Wilson – drums
Glenn Worf – bass guitar
Jonathan Yudkin – fiddle

Production
Tracks 1, 3, 9: Byron Gallimore and Tim McGraw
Tracks 4-6, 8, 11: Byron Gallimore and Jo Dee Messina
Track 2, 7, 10, 12: Mark Bright and Jo Dee Messina

Chart performance

Weekly charts

Year-end charts

References

2005 albums
Albums produced by Byron Gallimore
Curb Records albums
Jo Dee Messina albums
Albums produced by Mark Bright (record producer)